George Howard (September 15, 1956 – March 20, 1998) was an American smooth jazz saxophonist.

Music career
Howard was born on September 15, 1956, in Philadelphia. He was only six when he began taking music lessons at school on clarinet and bassoon. Influenced by John Coltrane and Wayne Shorter, he later on chose the soprano saxophone, because it resembled the bassoon. By the time he was 15, he began touring the country with notable rhythm-and-blues groups such as Blue Magic, First Choice and Harold Melvin and the Blue Notes. In the late 1970s, he toured with saxophonist Grover Washington, Jr., who was one of his idols.

In the early 1980s, Howard started his solo career, and released his first and second studio albums, Asphalt Gardens in 1982, and Steppin' Out in 1984. Both albums were well received and ranked high on the Billboard magazine jazz album charts at No. 25 and 9, respectively.  The last track on 'Steppin' Out' is called 'Dream Ride', and features Howard playing soprano saxophone.  The track was promoted in 1984 in the United Kingdom by DJ Robbie Vincent, and is now a classic among soul and jazz enthusiasts. By 1985, his third album, Dancing in the Sun, had scaled the Billboard Jazz Album chart to No. 1. Each of his next three albums, Love Will Follow (1986), A Nice Place to Be (1986), and Reflections (1988), would also reach this height in the Jazz Album chart. After the success of Dancing in the Sun, Howard left GRP Records to join MCA Records through the 1988 release of Reflections. His next album Personal was released in 1990, which featured his biggest hit Shower You With Love.

However, he returned to GRP in 1990 and released Love and Understanding in 1991. It was followed by Do I Ever Cross Your Mind? (1992), When Summer Comes (1993), A Home Far Away (1994), which features the song "Grover's Groove", a tribute to Grover Washington Jr., and Attitude Adjustment (1996). His first five years with GRP, plus a selection of his MCA recordings, were summarized on 1997's The Very Best of George Howard and Then Some. During the 1996 Summer Olympics in Atlanta, Howard performed at a hospitality house for the continent of Africa, which influenced his music after a visit there. Howard returned to recording with Midnight Mood, which was released in January 1998, his final album before his death two months later. He stayed with GRP until his death from colon cancer at the age of 41 on March 20, 1998, in Atlanta. His final album, There's a Riot Goin' On was released posthumously by Blue Note Records two months after his death.

Howard was survived by his daughter, Jade Howard, and two sisters, Mary Howard and Doris Beverly.

Discography
 1982: Asphalt Gardens (Palo Alto)
 1984: Steppin' Out (Palo Alto)
 1985: Dancing in the Sun (Palo Alto)
 1986: Love Will Follow (Palo Alto)
 1986: A Nice Place to Be (MCA)
 1988: Reflections (MCA)
 1990: Personal (MCA)
 1991: Love and Understanding (GRP)
 1992: Do I Ever Cross Your Mind? (GRP)
 1993: When Summer Comes (GRP)
 1994: A Home Far Away (GRP)
 1996: Attitude Adjustment (GRP)
 1997: The Very Best of George Howard and Then Some (GRP)
 1998: Midnight Mood (GRP)
 1998: There's a Riot Goin' On (Blue Note)

References

External links
VH1 bio 
Fuller Up Dead Musician directory
Soulwalking site bio

American jazz soprano saxophonists
American male saxophonists
1956 births
1998 deaths
Musicians from Philadelphia
Smooth jazz saxophonists
Palo Alto Records artists
MCA Records artists
GRP Records artists
20th-century American saxophonists
Jazz musicians from Pennsylvania
20th-century American male musicians
American male jazz musicians
Deaths from colorectal cancer
Deaths from cancer in Georgia (U.S. state)